This is a list of Belgian football transfers for the 2018 summer transfer window. Only transfers involving a team from the professional divisions are listed, including the 16 teams in the Belgian First Division A and the 8 teams playing in the Belgian First Division B.

The summer transfer window will open on 1 July 2018, although several transfers will be announced prior to that date. Players without a club may join one at any time, either during or in between transfer windows. The transfer window ends on 1 September 2018, although a few completed transfers could still be announced a few days later.

Sorted by date

December 2017

January 2018

February 2018

March 2018

April 2018

May 2018

End of 2017–18 season
After the end of the 2017–18 season, several players will return from loan to another club or will not have their contracts extended. These will be listed here when the date is otherwise not specified.

June 2018

July 2018

August 2018

September 2018

Sorted by team

Belgian First Division A teams

Anderlecht

In:

Out:

Antwerp

In:

Out:

Cercle Brugge

In:

Out:

Charleroi

In:

Out:

Club Brugge

In:

Out:

Eupen

In:

Out:

Excel Mouscron

In:

Out:

Genk

In:

Out:

Gent

In:

Out:

Kortrijk

In:

Out:

Lokeren

In:

Out:

Oostende

In:

Out:

Sint-Truiden

In:

Out:

Standard Liège

In:

Out:

Waasland-Beveren

In:

 
 

 
 
 
 

 

 
 

Out:

Zulte Waregem

In:

Out:

First Division B

Beerschot Wilrijk

In:

Out:

Lommel

In:

Out:

Mechelen

In:

Out:

OH Leuven

In:

Out:

Roeselare

In:

Out:

Tubize

In:

Out:

Union SG

In:

Out:

Westerlo

In:

Out:

Footnotes

References

Belgian
Transfers Summer
2018 Summer